Markus Irle (born 5 February 1976) is an Austrian rower. He competed in the men's coxed pair event at the 1992 Summer Olympics.

References

1976 births
Living people
Austrian male rowers
Olympic rowers of Austria
Rowers at the 1992 Summer Olympics
Rowers from Linz